Thomas Nabais (born 25 May 2000) is a French ice dancer. With his skating partner, Marie Dupayage, he is the 2023 World University Games champion and has won two bronze medals at ISU Challenger Series events (2022 CS Nepela Memorial and 2022 CS Warsaw Cup).

Personal life 
Nabais was born on 25 May 2000 in Vitry-sur-Seine, France, a suburb of Paris. He has a younger sister, Léane.

Career

Early years 
Nabais began learning to skate in 2008. Skating with Marie Dupayage, he made his junior international debut in November 2016 at the Tallinn Trophy. Dupayage/Nabais placed 14th at their first ISU Junior Grand Prix (JGP) event, JGP Austria, in late August 2017. Their best JGP results were seventh in Latvia and Italy in September and October 2019, respectively.

2021–22 season 
Dupayage/Nabais' senior international debut came in October 2021; they placed fifth at the Trophée Métropole Nice Côte d'Azur and had the same result at the 2021 CS Denis Ten Memorial Challenge. In December, they finished fourth at the French Championships. In January 2022, they won silver at the Bavarian Open in Oberstdorf, Germany.

2022–23 season 
Dupayage/Nabais began their season by winning bronze at the 2022 CS Nepela Memorial and then silver at the Trophée Métropole Nice Côte d'Azur in October. In November, they placed ninth at the 2022 Grand Prix de France, their first Grand Prix appearance, and then took bronze at the 2022 CS Warsaw Cup.

Programs

With Dupayage

Competitive highlights 
GP: Grand Prix; CS: Challenger Series; JGP: Junior Grand Prix

With Dupayage

References

External links 
 

2000 births
Living people
French male ice dancers
People from Vitry-sur-Seine
Competitors at the 2023 Winter World University Games
Medalists at the 2023 Winter World University Games
Universiade medalists in figure skating
Universiade gold medalists for France